The 2019 Damallsvenskan was the 32nd season of the Swedish women's association football top division, Damallsvenskan. It began on 13 April 2019, and ended on 26 October. Kopparbergs/Göteborg FC are the defending champions, having won the competition in 2018.

Kungsbacka DFF and KIF Örebro DFF were promoted from 2018 Elitettan after finishing first and second respectively. Kungsbacka makes their first appearance in Damallsvenskan. 

All matches can be viewed worldwide for a fee at Damallsvenskan TV .

On 20 October, the winner of Damallsvenskan was settled, when FC Rosengård netted one point in the league table and gained an impregnable lead with one remaining round against then relatively new closest competitor Kopparbergs/Göteborg FC. This is their 10th win of Damallsvenskan, the first club to achieve that. They immediately put a star on top of their emblem to mark this. Vittsjö GIK had held the second place for some time but failed to hold on to it at the end.

Teams 

Notes:
1 According to each club information page previously available at the Swedish Football Association website for Damallsvenskan. Since May 2018 this is no longer present.

2 Kungsbacka DFF's home arena is really Tingbergsvallen, but because it didn't meet the requirements for Damallsvenskan, and SvFF did not grant dispensation, where particularly the lack of lightning was deemed unacceptable considering all games are broadcast, they had to relocate their games to Påskbergsvallen about 50 km away, in Varberg, instead.

League table 

C Last season's champion.
R Last season's runner up.
P1 Promoted to Damallsvenskan from last season's Elitettan, finishing first there.
P2 Promoted to Damallsvenskan from last season's Elitettan, finishing second there.

Position by round

Results

Results by team

Results by round

Top scorers 

.

Goal of the week

Attendance

Highest attendances 

All games with more than 1500.

Updated to games played on 20 October 2019.

Notes

References

External links 

 Season at soccerway.com
 Season at SvFF
 Damallsvenskan TV  – Video streaming of all matches both live and archived

Damallsvenskan seasons
Sweden
2019 in Swedish association football leagues
2019 in Swedish women's football